The Wesley Methodist Cathedral is a church in Accra, the capital of Ghana.
The church lies on Asafoatse Nettey Road, in Adedainkpo, a district of the Jamestown area of the city.  It was designed by W. F. Hedges.  Construction began in 1922, with Frederick Gordon Guggisberg laying the foundation stone, although it was not dedicated until 1960.

In 2000, the church was made a cathedral, part of the Methodist Church Ghana.  It is the seat of both the Bishop of Accra, and of the Presiding Bishop of Ghana.

References

Accra
Churches in Accra
Churches completed in 1960
20th-century Methodist church buildings